97th meridian may refer to:

97th meridian east, a line of longitude east of the Greenwich Meridian
97th meridian west, a line of longitude west of the Greenwich Meridian